Stir is a 1980 Australian film directed by Stephen Wallace in his feature directorial debut. The prison film was written by Bob Jewson, based upon his own experience, while incarcerated, of the 1974 prison riot at Bathurst Correctional Complex and the subsequent Royal Commission into New South Wales Prisons. The film was shot in Clare Valley, Gladstone and the Flinders Ranges in South Australia.  It premiered at the 1980 Cannes Film Festival.

Cast
 Bryan Brown as China Jackson
 Max Phipps as orton
 Gary Waddell as Dave
 Phil Motherwell as Alby
 Robert Noble as Riley

Production
Bob Jewson was a prisoner in Bathurst Gaol at the time of the riot and wrote a script, originally called Bathurst, based on the event. Martha Ansara who was working for the Prison Action Group read it and introduced Jewson to Stephen Wallace, who decided to make the film. Other accounts have Tony Green making the introduction.

The New South Wales Film Corporation was looking at investing in some films made by directors who had made successful short films. Wallace had just made the acclaimed one-hour drama The Love Letters from Teralba Road and they asked him if he had any projects. He told them about his prison drama.

As part of his preparations, Wallace had the actors do a clown workshop for four days and a longer workshop of three weeks. Most of them disliked the clown workshop which Wallace later admitted was a mistake.

The original drafts of the script had some female characters, such as a social worker and a girlfriend of Bryan Brown's character, but these were dropped.
 
The film was shot over five weeks in October and November 1979 in South Australia at an abandoned prison in Gladstone. The makers had trouble sourcing enough extras and had to fly them in from Adelaide; some of the actors who did appear had been to prison. Wallace tried to get more Aboriginal extras but was unable.

During filming the movie was known as The Promotion of Mr Smith until Jewson suggested the shorter title Stir. Wallace:
Bob Jewson said one thing - and I think this is what we tried to make the theme of the film, although it was very hidden - that riots don't happen out of the blue. The prison authorities make you believe that all these criminals that are incarcerated are at all times dangerous and they're trying to get out. But Bob said that's never true; most of them have accepted their lot and they're trying to serve their time. They only get into a riot situation when they're treated badly and unfairly over a long period. He said most people don't want a riot; they know what it's going to mean, longer in jail.

Reception
The film was reasonably popular and according to Wallace it made a profit.

Critical reception
David O'Connell of In Film Australia:

Accolades

At the 1980 Australian Film Institute Awards, Stir, received 13 nominations but did not win any categories.

DVD availability
The DVD is available from Umbrella Entertainment and contains a new 16:9 aspect ratio transfer, a 50-minute interview feature with key cast and crew, as well as the original theatrical trailer.

See also
Cinema of Australia

References

External links 
  
 
 Sir at Australian Screen Online
 Stir at Oz Movies

1980 films
1980 drama films
1980s prison films
Australian drama films
Films shot in Flinders Ranges
Films directed by Stephen Wallace
Australian action adventure films
1980 directorial debut films
Australian LGBT-related films
LGBT-related drama films
1980 LGBT-related films
1980s English-language films